Bartosz Smektała (born 22 August 1998) is an international speedway rider from Poland.

Speedway career 
Smektała won the gold medal at the World Under-21 Championship in the 2018 World Under-21 Championship.

World final appearances

World Under-21 Championship
 2016 - 13th - 16pts
 2017 - 2nd - 42pts
 2018 - 1st - 56pts
 2019 - 2nd - 45pts

References 

1998 births
Polish speedway riders
Living people